Whenever is a 2000 children's musical play with words by Alan Ayckbourn and music by Denis King, that was shown as the Stephen Joseph Theatre's Christmas production. It is loosely derived from The Wizard of Oz, and it is about a young Victorian girl named Emily to travels back and forth in time to avert a disaster.

External links and references
Whenever page on Alan Ayckbourn official website

Plays by Alan Ayckbourn
2000 plays
Science fiction theatre
Fantasy theatre